Tavien Feaster (born December 31, 1997) is an American football running back for the Montreal Alouettes of the Canadian Football League (CFL). He played college football at Clemson and South Carolina.

College career
Feaster began his collegiate career at Clemson. He rushed for 1,330 yards and 15 touchdowns and was part of the Tigers' 2016 and 2018 national championship teams. Feaster announced that he would be transferring to South Carolina as a graduate transfer following his junior season. He rushed 124 times for 572 yards and five touchdowns with 17 receptions for 87 yards in his lone season for the Gamecocks.

Professional career

Jacksonville Jaguars
Feaster was signed by the Jacksonville Jaguars as an undrafted free agent on April 27, 2020. He was released on August 8, 2020.

New York Giants
Feaster was signed by the New York Giants on August 27, 2020. He was waived on September 5, 2020, during of final roster cuts.

Detroit Lions
Feaster was signed to the Detroit Lions' practice squad on October 7, 2020. The Lions released him on October 13, 2020.

Arizona Cardinals
Feaster signed a reserve/futures contract with the Arizona Cardinals on April 15, 2021. He was waived on August 31, 2021, at the end of training camp. The Cardinals re-signed Feaster to their practice squad on October 5, 2021. He was released on October 25, but was re-signed one week later on November 1. Feaster was signed to the Cardinals' active roster on November 13, 2021, after starter Chase Edmonds was placed on injured reserve. He was waived on November 15 and re-signed to the practice squad. He was promoted back to the active roster on November 20. He was waived on November 22 and re-signed to the practice squad. He was again promoted back to the active roster on December 4. He was waived again on December 7 and re-signed to the practice squad.

References

External links
 Clemson Tigers bio
 South Carolina Gamecocks bio
 Arizona Cardinals bio

1997 births
Living people
Players of American football from South Carolina
American football running backs
South Carolina Gamecocks football players
Arizona Cardinals players
Clemson Tigers football players
Jacksonville Jaguars players
New York Giants players
Detroit Lions players
Sportspeople from Spartanburg, South Carolina